Borunda is a town in Bilada tahsil of Jodhpur district in Rajasthan. It is famous as the home of the Rupayan Sansthan and its founder Vijaydan Detha,  well known writer and folklorist.

Geography 

Demographics 
Census 2011:-

History 
Various communities lived in Borunda village, including the locally dominant Rajput and Charan. In the pre-independence period, the inter-rivalry and feuds between Rajputs and Charans had led to several murders and displacement.

Post-independence, the village pulled together under the long time leadership of Chandidan Detha, the long-time Sarpanch of Borunda.

Agricultural advances in Borunda 
Starting in 1948, an innovating group of farmers centering on the Detha family begun using a large diesel- operated tubewell going down 100-150 feet. In Borunda, the first tractor was purchased in 1954 and by 1960, the number rose to 17. It was noted that the village progressed in field of agriculture despite no government cooperative inducement being applied till 1970. By 1970, one third of the village was irrigated and reaping the fruits of exploiting the resulting opportunities to grow HYV seeds. The Charans of Borunda became well known in the filed of agriculture.

In 1970s, whereas in other regions of Jodhpur, scattered plots were being irrigated through persian wheels or tanks constructed long ago by local rulers in Raj era, in Borunda the entire village floated on water due to adoption of tubewells.

Additionally, Borunda had sweet ground water available in lime stone formation and filled valleys. The extensive use of this ground water changed the landuse pattern of the village, particularly during the green revolution phase. It also pushed up the economy of the village as a whole.

However, by 1980, large tubewells of the 1960s were abandoned and now each of the 100 plus farmers had his own tubewell, but the total amount of irrigated acreage had decreased. Morever, power cuts became regular and forced farmers who had run their tubewells for 16-24 hours a day to 8-12 hours a day, thus decreasing productivity.

Rupayan Sansthan 
In 1961, the resulting prosperity of Borunda led to the foundation of Rupayan Sansthan by Vijaydan Detha and Komal Kothari. This village-based institution is known for conserving and studying Rajasthani folk culture. The institution supported the publication of folk tales, and a journal.

Notable people 

 Chandi Dan Detha
 Komal Kothari
 Vijaydan Detha

Further reading 

 Timberg, Thomas A. (1981). "Berunda: A Case of Exhausted Development". Economic and Political Weekly. 16 (8): 265–265. ISSN 0012-9976.

References 

Cities and towns in Jodhpur district
Charan